Aleksandr Sergeyevich Irkhin (10 January 1954 – 18 May 2019) was a professional Russian football coach.

Honours

As a coach
FC Astana-1964
Kazakhstan Cup: 2003
Kazakhstan Premier League: 2003 (3rd place)

References

External links 
 Александр Ирхин: «Гамулу нельзя было назвать пьяницей — он из тех, кто попадается» // Match TV
 Aleksandr Irkhin at the  sports.ru 

1954 births
People from Azov
2019 deaths
Russian football managers
Expatriate football managers in Kazakhstan
FC Dynamo Stavropol managers
FC Lada-Tolyatti managers
FC Tyumen managers
FC Rubin Kazan managers
FC Fakel Voronezh managers
FC Chernomorets Novorossiysk managers
FC Astana-1964 managers
Russian Premier League managers
Russian expatriate sportspeople in Kazakhstan
FC Khimki managers
Sportspeople from Rostov Oblast